"The Pack" is the sixth episode of season 1 of the television series Buffy the Vampire Slayer. The episode was written by story editors Matt Kiene and Joe Reinkemeyer, and directed by Bruce Seth Green. In the episode, Buffy's friend Xander and four classmates are possessed by animal spirits, causing them to act increasingly like predators.

Plot
Buffy and her Sunnydale High classmates are on a field trip to the zoo. A gang of four bullies named Kyle, Tor, Rhonda and Heidi taunts and terrorizes other students, and when one boy, Lance Lincoln, does not have the courage to tell Principal Flutie what they have done to him, they "reward" him by taking him with them to the Hyena House even though it is under quarantine. Xander follows to help him, whereas Willow and Buffy are stopped by a warden. In the Hyena House, the hyenas' eyes flash as they look at the gang of four and Xander. Their eyes flash in return.

Xander is now part of the gang, and his behavior has changed; he becomes insulting and cruel, especially to Willow. Even more ominous, the school's new mascot piglet Herbert tries to flee when he smells Xander. Giles does not initially believe anything is wrong with Xander since he is a 16-year-old boy until the missing Herbert is found dead - and eaten. After checking his books, Giles warns that they could be dealing with a case of possession. Buffy runs to find Xander, and finds the piglet's cage demolished. Xander jumps Buffy, pins her to the floor and tries to rape her, Buffy knocks him unconscious with a desk and locks him in the book cage in the library. When Flutie finds the mascot dead, he knows that the original gang of four are involved and calls them into his office. There, they start encircling him, close in and finally attack, kill and eat the terrified Flutie.

Returning from a teacher's meeting to the library, Giles tells Willow and Buffy about what happened to Flutie. Giles and Buffy go see the zoo warden who tells them that he is not surprised by the possession and knows about the magic involved, but is not sure how the students were affected: he has not been able to figure out the ritual. Giles supplies the missing information: a predatory act is required, like when the original four students tormented the boy.

Buffy offers herself as bait to lure them back to the Hyena House where the warden, now in full Maasai ritual attire, is supposed to perform a reverse of the possession spell with Giles' help. Giles realizes that the warden had tried to call the power for himself, but could not figure out how until he learned about the predatory act from Giles. The warden then knocks Giles unconscious.

Willow reaches the Hyena House before Buffy, and the warden ties her up and puts a knife to her throat, telling her it is the "predatory act" that will trigger the ritual and save the students. Buffy arrives with the others close behind. The pursuing pack knocks her down, and the warden uses this predatory act to shout a spell that pulls the animal spirits from the five students into himself. In the ensuing fight, Buffy knocks the warden into the hyenas' pen, where he is eaten. The gang of four flees.

The next day, out of embarrassment, Xander convincingly lies to Buffy and Willow that he has no memory of being possessed. Giles knows the truth and agrees to keep Xander's secret.

Broadcast and reception
"The Pack" was first broadcast on The WB on April 7, 1997. It earned a Nielsen rating of 2.4 on its original airing.

Noel Murray of The A.V. Club gave "The Pack" a grade of B, writing that "the storytelling in this episode is engaging and a few of the scenes genuinely creepy", though its central metaphor was not as developed as "Teacher's Pet". He felt that the episode was an example of how Sunnydale High did not feel like a believable high school, and criticized some of the action and the teenagers' hyena characteristics, but he praised Flutie's murder and Willow's development. On the other hand, DVD Talk's Philip Duncan described the episode as "Another standard plot that's made more interesting by the school setting and the similarities to real life groups and pressure that are often found in school." A review from the BBC described it as "a highly inventive episode with an unusual premise, albeit one that is somewhat difficult to believe." The review praised Xander actor Nicholas Brendon, but felt that "the supernatural elements are clumsily handled" and called the ending "rushed and muddled".

References

External links
 

Buffy the Vampire Slayer (season 1) episodes
1997 American television episodes
Hyenas in popular culture
Television episodes about spirit possession
Television episodes  about  cannibalism
Television episodes about bullying
Television episodes about mammals